was Yoshinobu Nishizaki's attempt at a sequel to Space Battleship Yamato, set several hundred years after the original series. However, Nishizaki was sued by Leiji Matsumoto for breach of copyright. Ultimately, Yamato 2520 was left unfinished after only three episodes (of planned ten) were released. The episodes came out on VHS and LaserDisc for home media.

The OVA series features mechanical designs by Syd Mead and a soundtrack by jazz musician David Matthews.

Cast

 Kazukiyo Nishikiori as Nabu Ancient
 Tomo Sakurai as Marcie Shima
 Yasunori Matsumoto as Aga Serene 
 Ichirō Nagai as Tōgō Shima 
 Yoko Asagami as Amethis
 Akira Kamiya as Rikiyard 
 Chafūrin as Jog
 Isshin Chiba as Kemushi/Doc
 Shigeru Chiba as Speed
 Kenyū Horiuchi as Emilio
 Masatō Ibu as Blauné
 Kōji Ishii as Moai
 Hideyuki Umezu as Packard
 Ken Yamaguchi as Tonbe
 Konami Yoshida as Susha
 Hiro Yuuki as Konman
 Taichirō Hirokawa as Narrator

Explanatory notes

References

External links
 Starblazers Official website 
 
 
 YAMATO2520 Page（ファンサイト） 

1994 anime OVAs
Adventure anime and manga
Science fiction anime and manga
Space Battleship Yamato